This page lists deputy prime ministers or ministers-president of Prussia.

Deputy prime ministers and ministers-president of Prussia, 1873–1918
 Otto von Camphausen 1873–1878
 Otto Graf zu Stolberg-Wernigerode 1878–1881
 Robert von Puttkamer 1881–1888
 Karl Heinrich von Boetticher 1888–1897
 Johannes von Miquel 1897–1901
 Theobald von Bethmann Hollweg 1907–1909
 Clemens von Delbrück 1914–1916
 Paul von Breitenbach 1916–1917
 Robert Friedberg 1917–1918

See also
 Prime Minister of Prussia.

 
 
Lists of government ministers of Prussia